This is a list of suburbs and places of interest in the City of Sunderland, Tyne and Wear, England.

Suburbs

North of the River Wear
Carley Hill
Castletown
Downhill
Fatfield
Fulwell
Hylton Castle
Marina
Marley Pots
Monkwearmouth
North Hylton
Redhouse
Roker
Seaburn
Sheepfolds
Southwick
Springwell Village
Town End Farm
Witherwack

South of the River Wear
Ashbrooke
Ayres Quay
Barnes
Christchurch
City Centre
Deptford
Doxford Park
East End
Farringdon
Ford Estate
Gilley Law
Grangetown
Grindon
Grove
Hall Farm
Hastings Hill
Hendon
The Herringtons
Hill View
Hollycarrside
Leechmere
Mill Hill
Millfield
Moorside
Newbottle
Nookside
Pallion
Pennywell
Penshaw
Plains Farm
Ryhope
Silksworth
Shiney Row
South Hylton
Springwell
Sunderland Docks
Sunniside
Thorney Close
Thornhill
Tunstall
Warden Law
Vaux

Places of interest

Fulwell Mill  
Herrington Country Park  
Hylton Castle 
Monkwearmouth Station Museum 
Mowbray Park 
National Glass Centre 
North East Aircraft Museum 
Northern Gallery for Contemporary Art 
Penshaw Monument 
Roker Park 
Roker beach 
Ryhope Engines Museum 
Seaburn beach 
Souter Lighthouse 
Sunderland Empire Theatre
Sunderland Museum and Winter Gardens 
Stadium of Light
Sunderland Volunteer Life Brigade Museum 
St. Peters Church  (World heritage site applicant)
Washington 'F' Pit museum 
Washington Old Hall  
Wildfowl & Wetlands Trust

City of Sunderland